The 1988 Washington State Cougars football team was an American football team that represented Washington State University in the Pacific-10 Conference (Pac-10) during the 1988 NCAA Division I-A football season. In their second and final season under head coach Dennis Erickson, the Cougars compiled a 9–3 record (5–3 in Pac-10, tied for third), and outscored their opponents 415 to 303.

The team's statistical leaders included Timm Rosenbach with 3,097 passing yards, Steve Broussard with 1,280 rushing yards, and Tim Stallworth with 1,151 receiving yards.

On October 29, Washington State beat No. 1 UCLA at the Rose Bowl, their first and only win ever over a No. 1 ranked team.

Several months after this season, Erickson departed for Miami in early March 1989, and Mike Price was hired a week later; a former Cougar player and assistant, he was previously the head coach for eight years in the Big Sky Conference at Weber State in Ogden, Utah.

Quarterback Rosenbach opted not to stay as a fifth-year senior in 1989 and announced his intent to turn professional in April. He entered the NFL's supplemental draft, and was selected in July with the second pick by the recently relocated Phoenix Cardinals.

Schedule

Source:

Roster

Season summary

Illinois

    
    
    
    
    
    
    
    

Steve Broussard: 27 Rush, 173 Yds

Washington

Shawn Landrum blocked an Eric Canton punt which led to Timm Rosenbach's eventual game-winning fourth down touchdown run. Washington State secured an Aloha Bowl berth with the win.

NFL Draft
Three Cougars were selected in the 1989 NFL Draft, held April 23–24.

The supplemental draft was held on July 7.

References

External links
 Spokane Chronicle: Aloha Bowl '88 special pre-game section, December 22, 1988

Washington State
Washington State Cougars football seasons
Aloha Bowl champion seasons
Washington State Cougars football